Topeliopsis is a genus of lichenized fungi in the family Graphidaceae.

The genus name of Topeliopsis is in honour of Josef Poelt (1924-1995), who was a German-Austrian botanist (Bryology, Mycology and Lichenology) and was Professor of Systematic Botany at the Free University of Berlin in 1965.

The genus was circumscribed by Gintaras Kantvilas and Antonin Vězda in Lichenologist vol.32 on page 347 in 2000.

Species
Topeliopsis acutispora  – Australia
Topeliopsis athallina 
Topeliopsis azorica 
Topeliopsis corticola  – Australia
Topeliopsis decorticans 
Topeliopsis elixii 
Topeliopsis globosa 
Topeliopsis guaiquinimae 
Topeliopsis kantvilasii 
Topeliopsis lomatiae 
Topeliopsis macrocarpa 
Topeliopsis monospora 
Topeliopsis muscigena  – Australia
Topeliopsis novae-zelandiae 
Topeliopsis patagonica 
Topeliopsis subdenticulata 
Topeliopsis subtuberculifera 
Topeliopsis tuberculifera 
Topeliopsis vezdae  – Australia

References

Ostropales
Lichen genera
Ostropales genera
Taxa named by Antonín Vězda
Taxa named by Gintaras Kantvilas